Avenger (stylized as AVENGER) is an anime series, produced by Bandai Visual and Bee Train, and directed by Koichi Mashimo. It is set on post-apocalyptic colonized Mars. The series premiered across Japan between 1 October 2003 and 24 December 2003 on the TV Tokyo network. It was later licensed for North American distribution by Bandai's distributive unit across the region, Bandai Entertainment.

Plot
The story is set on a colonized Mars at some unspecified point in the future.  The majority of the human population is divided up into a number of small domed city-states.  Those who live outside the domes in the harsh wildernesses of the planet are known as Barbaroi.  Resources are scarce, and supplies are divided out between cities based on the outcome of gladiatorial battles between representative fighters from each.  Adding to the problems of the colonists, no children have been born on Mars for a decade.  The cause of the infertility is unknown, but people have turned to robots called dolls as a substitute for the presence of children in their lives.  And a red moon, Earth's moon, hangs over Mars, drawn towards the red planet after the destruction of Earth and ravaging it with lunar storms caused by gravitational fluctuations between Mars and its unwelcome satellite.

The protagonist of the story is Layla, a barbaroi gladiator with a mysterious past and follows her quest to defeat Volk, the ruler of Mars.  She is accompanied on her journey by Nei, a strange "doll", and Speedy, a doll breeder (or repairman).

Characters

A silent, brooding young woman, Layla is the only survivor of a colony ship which was destroyed by Volk over Mars to prevent its human cargo from further taxing the planet's already stretched resources.  She was trained to fight by Cross, and is now determined to avenge her parents and the other passengers of the colony ship by defeating Volk in a gladiator battle.

One of the "Original Dozen," the first colonists to arrive on Mars, Volk's life has been greatly extended by science.  Ruler and representative gladiator of Volk City, he is the closest thing to an overall ruler Mars has, and it was he who chose to destroy the refugee ship on which a young Layla was a passenger.  He feels his responsibility very deeply, and takes every action for the greater good of Mars and its people.  Their well-being is his greatest concern, and he will commit whatever sin he has to in order to ensure it.

Another of the Original Dozen, Westa wields authority alongside Volk, but has a much more peaceful approach to solving problems.  She cares a great deal for the people of the planet, and her concern for them, combined with the fact that she does not age due to the same life-lengthening technology as Volk, has caused many of them to revere "Goddess Westa" almost as a deity.

A real 10-year-old girl with different colored eyes. It's a mystery how she was born because Mars hasn't produced any children for a decade. She accompanies Layla everywhere, and is the only person or thing the stoic Layla seems to care for. Layla saw through Nei's disguise because she's been living outside the domed cities for so long, and has been living in the wild. Nei has been acting like a doll so she won't cause any trouble or attention to herself. She's been acting like a doll for so long that it has become a part of her a little bit. Nei follows Layla because she can act like herself and not like a doll around her. She has blond short hair, and her eyes are green (right) and purple (left). In the last episode, it was revealed that "she" was mistaken for a "he". Nei is actually a female.

An 18-year-old "doll breeder," Speedy has a friendly, affable personality. Speedy finds himself drawn to Layla after watching her victory in a gladiator battle at the dome city he lived in. He is also curious about Layla's mysterious doll, Nei.

The only other remaining member of the Original Dozen besides Volk, Westa and Jupiter, Cross (formerly known as Ares) left the dome cities after a disagreement with Volk and lived in the wilds. He adopted Layla after the colony ship she and her parents were aboard was destroyed and trained in gladiator combat.

Garcia

A barbaroi gladiator, Garcia encounters Layla early in her journey when she briefly became the representative gladiator of a dome city.  Layla defeats Garcia in combat, but chooses to spare his life.  Their paths cross again several times afterwards, including one incident in which Garcia assists Layla and her party in fighting off the vicious hunter dolls pursuing Nei.

Jupiter

Anime

Soundtrack
The music for Avenger was composed and performed by Japanese duo Ali Project, which has also contributed music to several, other anime series, including CLAMP School Detectives, Noir, Princess Resurrection and .hack//Roots.  The series opening Lunar Eclipse Grand Guignol (月蝕グランギニョル Gesshoku Guran Ginyoru) and ending (Mirai no Eve) themes and the score overall are considered by some fans and reviewers to be among the show's most memorable elements.  An Original Soundtrack album was released in Japan in 2003.

External links
Official site 

2003 anime television series debuts
Anime with original screenplays
Bandai Entertainment anime titles
Bandai Visual
Bee Train Production
Hidefumi Kimura
Production I.G
TV Tokyo original programming
Yuri (genre) anime and manga
Mars in television
2003 Japanese television series endings
Cyberpunk anime and manga